Zabrze (German: 1915–1945: Hindenburg O.S., full form: Hindenburg in Oberschlesien, Silesian: Zŏbrze) is an industrial city in Silesia in southern Poland, near Katowice. The west district of the Silesian Metropolis, a metropolis with a population of around 2 million. It is in the Silesian Highlands, on the Bytomka River, a tributary of the Oder.

Zabrze is located in the Silesian Voivodeship, which was reformulated in 1999. Before 1999 it was in Katowice Voivodeship. It is one of the cities composing the 2.7 million inhabitant conurbation referred to as the Katowice urban area, itself a major centre in the greater Silesian metropolitan area which is populated by just over five million people. The population of Zabrze as of December 2021 was 168,946, down from June 2009 when the population was 188,122. Zabrze is bordered by three other cities of the metropolitan area: Gliwice, Bytom and Ruda Śląska.

History

Early history

Biskupice, which is now a subdivision of Zabrze, was first mentioned in 1243 as Biscupici dicitur cirka Bitom. Zabrze (or Old Zabrze) was mentioned in 1295–1305 as Sadbre sive Cunczindorf (German for  Konrad/Kunze's village; sive = "or").  According to historical sources, mining in Zabrze dates back to the 13th century. The present-day districts of Mikulczyce and Rokitnica were locations of motte-and-bailey castles from the 13th-15th century, which are now archaeological sites. In the 1970s, archaeologists discovered an Epipalaeolithic flintwork and flint tools from the Mesolithic at the Mikulczyce archaeological site. In the Late Middle Ages, the local Silesian Piast dukes invited German settlers into the territory, resulting in increasing German settlement. The settlement was part of the Silesian duchies of fragmented Poland. Zabrze became part of the Habsburg monarchy of Austria in 1526, and was later annexed by the Kingdom of Prussia during the Silesian Wars. In 1774, the Dorotheendorf settlement was founded. In 1791, a coking coal seam was discovered in Zabrze, and then its first coking coal mine was opened. In the 19th century, new coal mines, steelworks, factories and a power plant were created. A road connecting Gliwice and Chorzów and a railway connecting Opole and Świętochłowice were led through Zabrze.

Early 20th century
In 1905, the Zabrze commune was formed by the former communes Alt-Zabrze, Klein-Zabrze and Dorotheendorf. The Zabrze commune was renamed Hindenburg in 1915 in honour of Generalfeldmarschall Paul von Hindenburg. The name change was approved by Emperor Wilhelm II on 21 February 1915. Up until then, it was one of the few cities whose Polish name was retained during German rule.

In 1904 the "Sokół" Polish Gymnastic Society in Zabrze was established, which was also a Polish patriotic and pro-independence organization. As a result of the Prussian harassment it was liquidated in 1911, but it was reactivated twice, in 1913 and 1918. Its members took an active part in the post-war plebiscite campaign and the Silesian uprisings.

Interwar period

During the plebiscite held after World War I, 21,333 inhabitants (59%) of the Hindenburg commune voted to remain in Germany, while 14,873 (41%) voted for incorporation to Poland, which just regained its independence. In May 1921 the Third Silesian Uprising broke out and Hindenburg was captured by Polish insurgents, who held it until the end of the uprising. When Upper Silesia was divided between Poland and Germany in 1921, the Hindenburg commune remained in Germany, while the present-day districts of Kończyce, Makoszowy and Pawłów were reintegrated with Poland. It received its city charter in 1922. Just five years after receiving city rights Hindenburg became the biggest city in German-ruled western Upper Silesia and the second biggest city in German-ruled Silesia after Wrocław (then Breslau). Nevertheless, various Polish organizations still operated in the city in the interbellum, including a local branch of the Union of Poles in Germany, Polish libraries, sports clubs, credit unions, choirs, scout troops and an amateur theater. Polish newspaper Głos Ludu was published in the city. In a secret Sicherheitsdienst report from 1934, Zabrze was named one of the main centers of the Polish movement in western Upper Silesia. In terms of religion, most of the city's population adhered to the Catholic Church.

In the 1920s, the communists, Christian democrats and nationalists enjoyed the greatest support among the German population, while Poles supported Polish parties. In 1928, among the largest cities in western Upper Silesia, Polish parties received the most votes in Zabrze. In the March 1933 elections, most of the citizens voted for the Nazi Party, followed by Zentrum and the Communist Party. Nazi politician Max Fillusch became the city's mayor and remained in the position until 1945.

The anti-Polish organization Bund Deutscher Osten was very active in the city, it dealt with propaganda, indoctrination and espionage of the Polish community, as well as denouncing Poles to local authorities. When, the Barbórka (traditional holiday of miners) church services were organized separately for Poles and Germans in 1936, the Polish service enjoyed a greater attendance, however, due to Nazi oppression and propaganda, the attendance at Polish services in the 1930s gradually decreased, according to Bund Deutscher Osten. Polish activists were increasingly persecuted since 1937. People were urged to Germanise their names, Polish inscriptions were removed from tombstones. Some Polish priests were expelled from the city, both before and during World War II. As a result of German persecution the Jewish community dropped from 1,154 people in 1933 to 551 in 1939, and its remainder was deported to concentration camps in 1942. The town's synagogue, that had stood since 1872, was destroyed in the Kristallnacht pogroms of November 1938.

World War Two
During World War II, in 1941 the German administration requisitioned church property, in which it removed Polish symbols and memorabilia. Church bells were confiscated for war purposes in 1942. The Germans established three forced labour subcamps of the Stalag VIII-B/344 prisoner-of-war camp in the city, two of which operated in the local coal mines, and also a subcamp of Auschwitz III was located there. Another subcamp of Stalag VIII-B/344 (E51) was operated at a coal mine in the present-day Mikulczyce district.

In January 1945, the Soviets captured the city and afterwards deported some inhabitants to the Soviet Union, while most of the German inhabitants were expelled west in accordance to the Potsdam Agreement.

Contemporary history

Following World War II, according to the Potsdam Agreement the city was handed over to Poland in 1945 and the town's name was changed to the historic Zabrze on 19 May 1945. The first post-war mayor of Zabrze was Paweł Dubiel, pre-war Polish activist and journalist in Upper Silesia, prisoner of the Dachau and Mauthausen concentration camps during the war. The pre-war Polish inhabitants of the region, who formed the majority of the city's population in 1948, were joined by Poles expelled from former eastern Poland annexed by the Soviet Union.

The city limits were largely expanded in 1951, by including Mikulczyce, Rokitnica, Grzybowice, Makoszowy, Kończyce and Pawłów as new districts. New neighbourhoods were built from the 1950s to 1990s. In 1948, Górnik Zabrze football club was founded, which won its first Polish championship in 1957, and soon became the pride of the city as one of the most successful clubs in Poland.

Administrative division

On 17 September 2012, the Zabrze city council decided on a new administrative division of the city. Zabrze was subsequently divided into 15 districts and 3 housing estates.

 1. Helenka
 2. Grzybowice
 3. Rokitnica
 4. Mikulczyce
 5. Młody Górnik estate
 6. Mikołaj Kopernik estate
 7. Biskupice
 8. Maciejów
 9. Tadeusz Kotarbiński estate
 10. Centrum Północ
 11. Centrum Południe
 12. Guido
 13. Zaborze Północ
 14. Zaborze Południe
 15. Pawłów
 16. Kończyce
 17. Makoszowy
 18. Zandka

Infrastructure
The Polish north–south A1 and east–west A4 motorways, which are parts of the European routes E75 and E40, respectively, run through Zabrze, and their junction is located just outside the city limits. In addition the Polish National roads 78, 88 and 94 also run through the city.
The Drogowa Trasa Srednicowa leads through the town.

Culture and sights
Dom Muzyki i Tańca ("House of Music and Dance") indoor arena is located in Zabrze. The Maciej mine shaft and the Main Key Adit (Główna Kluczowa Sztolnia Dziedziczna), one of the longest such structures in Europe, are open for tourists.

Among the historical architecture there are many industrial facilities, as well as various churches, houses, public buildings, etc. There are also numerous monuments referring to the history of the city, especially the Silesian uprisings fought here and World War II.

There is also a botanical garden and several parks in Zabrze.

Politics

Members of Parliament (Sejm) elected from Bytom/Gliwice/Zabrze constituency
 Chojnacki Jan, SLD-UP
 Dulias Stanisław, Samoobrona
 Gałażewski Andrzej, PO
 Janik Ewa, SLD-UP
 Kubica Józef, SLD-UP
 Martyniuk Wacław, SLD-UP
 Okoński Wiesław, SLD-UP
 Szarama Wojciech, PiS
 Szumilas Krystyna, PO
 Widuch Marek, SLD-UP

Sports 

The city's most renown sports team is Górnik Zabrze, one of the most accomplished Polish football clubs, 14 times Polish champions, 6 times Polish Cup winners, and 1969–70 European Cup Winners' Cup runners-up, as the only Polish team to reach the final stage of a major European football competition. Other popular team is NMC Górnik Zabrze, two times Polish men's handball champions and three times Polish Cup winners. Both teams compete in the national top leagues, the Ekstraklasa and Superliga respectively.

Many sportspeople were born in Zabrze, including footballers Jerzy Gorgoń, Łukasz Skorupski and Adam Bodzek, and pro ice hockey player of the National Hockey League, Wojtek Wolski.

Economy
Like other towns in this populous region, it is an important manufacturing centre, having coal-mines, iron, wire, glass, chemical and oil works, and local Upper Silesia Brewery, etc.

Notable people

James Kleist (1873–1949), German-American Jesuit scholar 
Heinz Fiebig (1897–1964), Wehrmacht general 
Jerzy Gorgoń (born 1949), Polish former football player
Fritz Katz (1898–1969), pioneer of adrenal transplants 
Wolfgang Jörchel (1907–1945), Standartenführer in the Waffen SS 
Władysław Turowicz (1908–1980), Polish-Pakistani military scientist
Fritz Laband (1925–1982), German footballer
Werner Heiduczek (1926–2019), German author
Friedrich Nowottny (born 1929), German television journalist
Janosch (born 1931), German author
Joachim Kroll (1933–1991), German serial killer
Joachim Kerzel (born 1941), German actor
Jan Sawka (1946–2012), Polish-American artist, architect
Krystian Zimerman (born 1956), Polish classical pianist
Waldemar Sorychta (born 1967), Polish heavy metal musician and producer
Sebastian Kawa (born 1972), Polish glider pilot, thirteen-time World Champion
Czesław Śpiewa, (born 1979), Polish singer
Wojtek Wolski (born 1986), Polish-Canadian ice-hockey player.
Margarete Stokowski (born 1986), Polish-German writer
Bartosz Bednorz (born 1994), Polish volleyball player

Twin towns – sister cities

Zabrze is twinned with:

Essen, Germany
Lund, Sweden
Rivne, Ukraine
Rotherham, England, United Kingdom
Sangerhausen, Germany
Seclin, France
Trnava, Slovakia
Zahlé, Lebanon

References

Bibliography

External links

 Municipal website 
 Zabrze Community 
 Portal Zabrze.com.pl 
 Encyclopædia Britannica Zabrze
 Jewish Community in Zabrze on Virtual Shtetl
 Old images of the city 
 http://www.zabrze.aplus.pl/

 
Cities in Silesia
Zabrze
Zabrze
Archaeological sites in Poland
Prehistoric sites in Poland